Essex Boys and Girls Clubs is a registered UK charity working with young people in Essex and East London.

Geographical Coverage 
Essex Boys and Girls Clubs delivers services to the UK county of Essex, including the districts of Southend-on-Sea and Thurrock, and to the East London boroughs of Redbridge, Barking and Dagenham, Havering, Waltham Forest, Newham and Hackney.

History 
Set up in 1939 as the Essex Association of Boys Clubs, the organisation changed its name in 2006 to Essex Boys and Girls Clubs to reflect the membership of its affiliated youth clubs. Augustine Courtauld (1904-1959) was the first Chairman of the charity.

Patron 
The patron of Essex Boys and Girls Clubs is HM Lord Lieutenant of Essex Mrs Jennifer Tolhurst.

National Affiliations 
The charity is affiliated to the National Association of Boys and Girls Clubs (NABGC).

Funding 
Essex Boys and Girls Clubs is funded partly by donations.

External links 

Youth charities based in the United Kingdom